Ruthin Town Football Club is a Welsh football club, based at the Memorial Playing Fields in Ruthin, Denbighshire. Football in Ruthin dates back to 1878 when a new club was formed. In 1880 Ruthin reached the final of the Welsh Cup only to lose 2-1 to Druids. However, the club in its present form dates back to 1949 when they joined the newly re-organised Welsh National League (Wrexham Area) as Ruthin British Legion.  They currently play in the Cymru North.

History
Ruthin Town joined division two coming runners up in their first year and gaining promotion to division 1. The following year they were runners up in the top division. 
The British Legion element of the name was dropped in 1953 and Ruthin Town FC was born.
In 1958 the club introduced a reserve team that entered the WNL (Wrexham Area) Division 3.
The first team won the first division in 1963–64 and the North Wales Challenge Cup in 1967.
The 1972–73 season was an exciting one for the Vale of Clwyd as both Ruthin and Denbigh were contesting the first division title. Denbigh won on goal difference with both teams having won 18, drawn 7 and lost 3. Ruthin, however, won the North Wales Challenge Cup for the second time.
In 1977–78 the first team was relegated from the first division which meant the reserves were also demoted from the second division. 
The following year the club introduced a third team which played in the Clwyd league. That team was later called the Colts as it joined the WNL (Wrexham Area) division 4 in 1980. The club runs three senior teams to this day.
1979–80 was a big season for the club as both the first team and reserves were promoted back to the first and second divisions both as champions of their respective leagues.
A decade of stability ensued with the three senior teams establishing themselves in their respective leagues with their youth system being set up in 1986. This youth system was to be the making of the club providing a consistent source of players for the senior teams. Most of the current first-team squad are products of that very youth system. The club currently runs 6 youth teams from under 12's to under 16's.
1991–92 the first team were runners up to Wrexham Reserves under Glyn Williams and were promoted to the Cymru Alliance. They also won the League Cup that year.  Ruthin were ever-present in the Cymru Alliance for a further 21 years before being relegated in 2013.
They won the WNL Premier League Cup in 2014 and matched their 1992 result in 2016 by gaining promotion back to the Huws Gray Alliance and winning the Premier League Cup for the second time in three years.
The club won the NEWFA Cup 2018 beating Holywell in the final. Their best HGA league position to date is third place 2003–04 under Tim Dyer.
As the second tier of Welsh Football comes under the wing of the FAW in 2019 Ruthin have been one of the longest-serving clubs in the Huws Gray Alliance along with Buckley Town. Ruthin serving 23 years and Buckley doing one better at 24.

On 27 August 2021 Ruthin played hosts to Guilsfield F C, kick off 7.45pm, for their first game under newly installed floodlights and with refurbished player facilities.

Honours

Information sourced includes from FCHD entries for Ruthin Town, Ruthin Town reserves and Ruthin Town Colts.
North Wales Amateur Cup – Winners: 1967, 1973
North East Wales FA Challenge Cup
Winners: 2017–18, 2021–22
Welsh National League (Wrexham Area)
Premier Division – Runners-up: 1991–92, 1999–2000 (reserves), 2015–16
First Division – Runners-up: 2001–02 (Colts)
Second Division – Champions: 1979–80
Second Division – Runners-up: 1992–93 (Colts)
Third Division – Champions: 1978–79
Third Division – Runners-up: 1989–90 (Colts)
Premier Division Cup – Winners: 1991–92, 2013–14, 2015–16
League Cup – Winners: 1979–80

International players
Six Ruthin players appeared for Wales between 1880 and 1895:

Uriah Goodwin – 1 cap
Richard Jarrett – 2 caps
Arthur Lloyd – 2 caps
William Pierce Owen – 12 caps
Walter Hugh Roberts – 5 caps (out of 6)

References

External links
Official Club Website

Football clubs in Wales
Association football clubs established in 1949
Sport in Denbighshire
Ruthin
Cymru Alliance clubs
Cymru North clubs
Welsh National League (North) clubs
North Wales Coast League clubs